Jane Richardson may refer to:

Jane Richardson (author) (1919–2018), American author
Jane S. Richardson (born 1941), American biochemist